James Meikle McKinlay (1875-1961), was a Scottish born  England international lawn bowls player who competed in the 1934 British Empire Games.

Bowls career
At the 1934 British Empire Games he finished in fourth place in the pairs event.

He was the 1933 singles National Champion.

Personal life
He moved to Middlesex, England before returning to Scotland many years later.

References

English male bowls players
Bowls players at the 1934 British Empire Games
1875 births
1961 deaths
Commonwealth Games competitors for England